The International Journal of Food Microbiology is a peer-reviewed scientific journal publishing research papers, short communications, review articles, and book reviews in area of food microbiology and relates fields of mycology, bacteriology, virology, parasitology, and immunology. It is currently published by Elsevier on behalf of the International Union of Microbiological Societies and Committee on Food Microbiology and Hygiene, and edited by L. Cocolin (Università di Torino).

Abstracting and indexing
The journal is abstracted and indexed in:

According to the Journal Citation Reports, the journal has a 2021 impact factor of 5.911.

References

Microbiology journals
Publications established in 1984